Kavak Yelleri (literally "Poplar Winds", English title: Daydreaming) is a Turkish youth drama television series produced by TIMS Productions and Sony Pictures Television International. Kavak Yelleri is a remake of the American show Dawson's Creek created by Kevin Williamson and was broadcast on Kanal D from 2007 to 2011. Soundtrack songs of Pinhani are Turkish soundtrack classics. The theme song of the series is 'Hele Bi Gel' by the band Pinhani.

Synopsis 
The series follows a group of friends growing up in the small town of Urla and afterwards in İstanbul. Aslı (Joey) is a doctor, Mine (Jen) is an interpreter, Efe (Pacey) has a restaurant and Deniz (Dawson) is a photographer who wants be a director. Deniz has romantic relationships with "Mine" and "Aslı".

After Efe died, Aslı's new lover is thief "Güven". After the years, Güven realizes that Efe didn't die. Although Güven loves Aslı, He makes the two ex-lovers Aslı and Efe meet. But Efe is terminally ill. Aslı gave birth Efe's son, After Efe died.

Deniz's wife "Ada" died. Mine's psychopath husband  "Burak" divorced. Then, "Mine" and "Deniz" married and they have a daughter.

Cast 
The main characters are Aslı Zeybek (Pelin Karahan), Deniz Akça (İbrahim Kendirci), Mine Ergun (Aslı Enver) and Efe Kaygısız (Dağhan Külegeç). Su (Ceren Moray) and Güven Karakuş (Sarp Apak) were introduced in later episodes.

References

External links
Kavak Yelleri - Official site
Kanal D series page

Dawson's Creek
2007 Turkish television series debuts
Turkish drama television series
2000s teen drama television series
2010s teen drama television series
2011 Turkish television series endings
2000s Turkish television series
2010s Turkish television series
Television series by Sony Pictures Television
Kanal D original programming
Television shows set in İzmir
Turkish television series endings
Turkish television series based on American television series